Flax lueneborgi is a moth of the family Erebidae first described by Michael Fibiger in 2011. It is found in Papua New Guinea (it was described from Dyaul Island within the Bismarck Islands).

Description
The forewings (including fringes) are beige brown, with light-brown subterminal and terminal areas. The base of the costa and the quadrangular patch in the upper medial area are dark brown, with a black dot in the inner lower area. The crosslines are mostly indistinct and brown. The subterminal line is brown and the terminal line is indicated by dark-brown interveinal dots. The hindwings are light grey with an indistinct discal spot. The underside of the forewings is  brown and the underside of the hindwings is grey with a discal spot.

All known specimens have been collected in malaise traps near Sumuna, a small village within a primary forest.

References

External links

Micronoctuini
Taxa named by Michael Fibiger
Moths described in 2011